Sunagawa Station (砂川駅 Sunagawa eki) is a railway station on the Hakodate Main Line of Hokkaido Railway Company, located in Sunagawa, Hokkaidō, Japan, opened in 1891. The station previously served the closed Utashinai Line and Kamisunagawa Branch Line.

Trains
Limited express
Okhotsk (for Sapporo and )

Places nearby
Sunagawa Park Hotel
Route 12
Sunagawa Post Office
Sunagawa Terminal

References 

Railway stations in Japan opened in 1891
Sunagawa Station